Desh is a 2002 Bengali film directed by Raja Sen.

Cast 
Jaya Bachchan as Suprabha Chowdhury
Sabyasachi Chakrabarty
Abhishek Bachchan as Anjan

Production 
Abhishek Bachchan starred with his mother Jaya Bachchan for the first time with this film. Abhishek Bachchan was in Kolkata at made a cameo in the film, but he did not speak in Bengali for the film.

References

External links
 

2002 films
2000s Bengali-language films
Bengali-language Indian films